Fort Victoria was a  cruise ship which was built in 1912 as Willochra. During the First World War she was requisitioned for use as a troopship. In 1920 she was sold and renamed Fort Victoria, serving until lost in a collision in 1929.

History
Willochra was built by William Beardmore & Co Ltd, Dalmuir, West Dunbartonshire. She was yard number 507 and was launched on 14 August 1912. Completion was on 7 February 1913. Willochra was built for the Adelaide Steamship Company. Her identical sister ships, also built by William Beardmore and Company, were SS Warilda (1911) and Wandilla (1912).

In 1913, Willochra was chartered by the Union Steamship Company of New Zealand. In November 1914, Willochra was requisitioned, as a troopship making numerous journeys with reinforcements to the war, notably Egypt, and returning with wounded. In 1918 she was requisitioned by the British for Trans-atlantic duties and painted in dazzle camouflage. At the end if the war she repatriated German prisoners to Europe.

In 1919, Willochra was sold to Furness Withy. She was refitted and renamed Fort Victoria. Initially, she was operated by the Quebec Steamship Co, Montreal but in 1921 she was transferred to the Bermuda & West Indies Steamship Co, Hamilton, Bermuda. Both companies were owned by Furness Withy.
On 18 December 1929, Fort Victoria sailed from New York Harbor for Hamilton with just over 200 passengers on board. The weather at the time was dense fog, and Fort Victoria stopped to await an improvement in conditions. While anchored, she was hit by the Clyde-Mallory Line's , a liner which was on a voyage from Galveston, Texas to New York. Algonquin cut into the port side of Fort Victoria. Distress calls were made by both ships, which were answered by the United States Coast Guard and other ships in the area. All on board Fort Victoria were rescued before the ship sank later that day.

Description
The ship was a  cruise ship. As Fort Victoria she was fitted up for 400 first class passengers, no lower class accommodation being provided.

Model
A boardroom model of Willochra is in the possession of the Newport Harbor Nautical Museum, Newport Beach, California.

References

External links
Colour postcard of SS Fort Victoria
Monochrome postcard of Fort Victoria

Merchant ships of Canada
Steamships of Canada
World War I merchant ships of Canada
Merchant ships of Australia
Merchant ships of Bermuda
Steamships of Bermuda
1912 ships
Cruise ships
Troop ships
Maritime incidents in 1929
Iron and steel steamships of Australia
Ships built on the River Clyde
Shipwrecks of the New Jersey coast